Ingrid Boyeldieu (February 7, 1977 - July 24, 2019) was a French international footballer who played for Paris Saint-Germain as a centre-forward.

References

1977 births
2019 deaths
People from Oise
FCF Hénin-Beaumont players
Paris Saint-Germain Féminine players
French women's footballers
Division 1 Féminine players
Women's association football forwards
France women's international footballers